Adriano Correia Claro (born 26 October 1984), known simply as Adriano, is à former Brazilian professional footballer who last played for Belgian club Eupen. One of few players in professional football who are genuinely ambidextrous, he is capable of playing as a defender or midfielder on both sides of the pitch.

After starting his career with Coritiba, he moved to Spain in 2005, going on to spend several seasons in La Liga with Sevilla and Barcelona and win several major titles with both clubs, including the treble with the latter in 2015.

A Brazilian international for ten years, Adriano represented his country in two Copa América tournaments, winning the 2004 edition.

Club career

Early years and Sevilla

Born in Curitiba, Paraná, Adriano started professionally for his hometown club Coritiba, making his first-team debuts at not yet 18. In January 2005 he joined Spain's Sevilla FC in a four-and-a-half-year deal, his La Liga debut arriving on the 29th in a 4–0 home loss against eventual champions FC Barcelona; the Andalusians, however, did finish sixth and qualified for the UEFA Cup.

In the following seasons, Adriano continued to feature in several positions for Sevilla with equal success as they won back-to-back UEFA Cups, with the player contributing with 25 games and four goals in both editions combined. In the final of the latter edition, he opened the score against RCD Espanyol in an eventual penalty shootout win; previously, in late September 2006, he had added a further five years to his link.

After three years residing in the country, Adriano was granted Spanish citizenship. He struggled with some injuries during the 2009–10 campaign, but still contributed with 27 matches (no goals) as his team finished fourth and returned to the UEFA Champions League.

Barcelona
On 16 July 2010, Adriano signed a 4+1 contract with Barcelona, for €9.5 million plus a conditional fee of €4 million – it also included a buyout clause of €90 million. He was awarded the No. 21 shirt vacated by Dmytro Chyhrynskyi, and made his debut in a pre-season friendly against Vålerenga Fotball, coming on as a second-half substitute; on 14 August he first appeared officially, in the first leg of Supercopa de España, a 3–1 loss at former side Sevilla.

Adriano spent the vast majority of his first season with Barça as a substitute. On 2 February 2011, in a rare start, he scored his first goal for the Catalans in a 3–0 semi-final away win against UD Almería in the Copa del Rey (8–0 on aggregate); due to the illness of first-choice left-back Eric Abidal he became a regular starter from March onwards, although the Frenchman recovered in time to start in the 2011 UEFA Champions League Final.

In 2011–12, Adriano was again mostly a reserve for the Pep Guardiola-led side. On 15 December 2011, however, in the 2011 FIFA Club World Cup, he scored the first two goals in a 4–0 semi-final win over Sadd Sports Club, the first coming after a mistake by the Qatari team's defense to open the score in the 25th minute.

Early into the 2012–13 season, Adriano played the role of hero and villain in a matter of days: in the Spanish Supercup second leg he was sent off midway through the first half of an eventual 2–1 away loss against Real Madrid (4–4 aggregate defeat on the away goals rule), for bringing down Cristiano Ronaldo as the last man; On 2 September 2012, he scored the game's only goal at home against Valencia CF, through a spectacular right-foot curl.

On 28 May 2013, Adriano signed a new contract with Barcelona, keeping him at the club until 2017. During the 2014 pre-season, after being diagnosed with an irregular heartbeat, he was sidelined for several weeks, but eventually recovered fully.

Adriano scored his first goal of the 2015–16 campaign on 24 November 2015, hitting home following a missed penalty from Neymar and closing the score at 6–1 against A.S. Roma in the Champions League group stage. He had replaced Sergi Roberto for the last 26 minutes of the match.

Beşiktaş
On 29 July 2016, after having appeared in 189 competitive matches for Barcelona and scored 17 goals, Adriano signed for Beşiktaş J.K. in Turkey. He netted once from 31 appearances in his first season, helping the club win its 15th Süper Lig championship.

Athletico Paranaense
Adriano returned to Brazil on 23 July 2019, with the 34-year-old joining Athletico Paranaense on a one-and-a-half-year deal.

Eupen
In August 2020, Adriano signed a new contract with the Belgian First Division A team Eupen on a free transfer. He left the club at the end of the 2020–21 season and in September 2021 he was looking for a club.

International career
Shortly after helping the Brazilian under-20s win the 2003 FIFA World Youth Championship, Adriano made his full team debut also in that year. In 2004, he was part of the squad that won the Copa América in Peru.

Career statistics

Club

Notes

International

Honours
Coritiba
Campeonato Paranaense: 2003, 2004

Sevilla
Copa del Rey: 2006–07, 2009–10
UEFA Cup: 2005–06, 2006–07
UEFA Super Cup: 2006

Barcelona
La Liga: 2010–11, 2012–13, 2014–2015, 2015–16
Copa del Rey: 2011–12, 2014–15, 2015–16
Supercopa de España: 2010, 2011
UEFA Champions League: 2010–11, 2014–15
UEFA Super Cup: 2011
FIFA Club World Cup: 2011, 2015

Beşiktaş
Süper Lig: 2016–17

Athletico Paranaense
Campeonato Paranaense: 2020

Brazil
Copa América: 2004

Brazil U20
FIFA U-20 World Cup: 2003

References

External links

 
 
 
 
 

1984 births
Living people
Brazilian people of Portuguese descent
Naturalised citizens of Spain
Footballers from Curitiba
Brazilian footballers
Association football defenders
Association football midfielders
Association football utility players
Campeonato Brasileiro Série A players
Coritiba Foot Ball Club players
Club Athletico Paranaense players
La Liga players
Sevilla FC players
UEFA Cup winning players
FC Barcelona players
Süper Lig players
Beşiktaş J.K. footballers
Belgian Pro League players
K.A.S. Eupen players
UEFA Champions League winning players
Brazil under-20 international footballers
Brazil international footballers
2003 CONCACAF Gold Cup players
2004 Copa América players
2011 Copa América players
Copa América-winning players
Brazilian expatriate footballers
Expatriate footballers in Spain
Expatriate footballers in Turkey
Expatriate footballers in Belgium
Brazilian expatriate sportspeople in Spain
Brazilian expatriate sportspeople in Turkey